Pseudoglenea densepuncticollis is a species of beetle in the family Cerambycidae, and the only species in the genus Pseudoglenea. It was described by Gilmour and Stephan von Breuning in 1963.

References

Saperdini
Beetles described in 1963